Ratschings is a comune (municipality) in South Tyrol in northern Italy, located about  north of the city of Bolzano, on the border with Austria.

Geography

Ratschings borders the following municipalities: Brenner, Freienfeld, Moos in Passeier, St. Leonhard in Passeier, Sarntal, Sterzing, Neustift im Stubaital (Austria) and Sölden (Austria).

Frazioni
The municipality of Ratschings contains the frazioni (subdivisions, mainly villages and hamlets) Außerratschings, Innerratschings, Gasteig (Casateia), Mareit (Mareta), Ridnaun (Ridanna), Telfes (Telves), and Jaufental (Valgiovo).

History

Coat-of-arms
The emblem show a rampant argent wolf on azure. The arms is similar to that of Wolf von Mareit, but with the opposite colors. The emblem was adopted in 1969.

Society

Linguistic distribution
According to the 2011 census, 97.77% of the population speak German, 2.14% Italian and 0.10% Ladin as first language.

Demographic evolution

Gallery

References

External links
 Homepage of the municipality

Municipalities of South Tyrol